Wadhwani is originally a Pakistani Sindhi Muslim/Hindu surname. Notable people with the surname include:

Nirmala Wadhwani (born 1964), Indian politician 
Romesh Wadhwani (born 1946/47), Indian-American businessman
Sunil Wadhwani (born 1952/1953), Indian-born American businessman and philanthropist
Sushil Wadhwani (born 1959), British businessman

See also
Wadhwa
Wadhawan

Indian surnames
Surnames of Indian origin
Sindhi-language surnames
Hindu surnames